This is a list of past and present members of the Senate of Canada representing the province of Prince Edward Island.

Prince Edward Island, was guaranteed four Senate seats at the 1864 conference in Quebec City of the "Fathers of Confederation", Prince Edward Island representatives campaigned for equal representation claiming that the rights of small provinces needed to be safe guarded. Prince Edward Island delayed joining confederation until 1873 for various reasons including the Senate question.
Under the Prince Edward Island Terms of Union, 1873 Prince Edward Island was given four Senate seats.

Current senators

Notes:

1 Senators are appointed to represent Prince Edward Island. Each senator may choose to designate a geographic area within the province as his or her division.
2 Senators are appointed by the Governor-General of Canada on the recommendation of the prime minister.

Historical

Notes:

1 Senators are appointed to represent Prince Edward Island. Each senator may choose to designate a geographic area within Prince Edward Island as his or her division.
2 Senators are appointed by the Governor-General of Canada on the recommendation of the prime minister.

Maritimes regional senators
Senators listed were appointed to represent the Maritimes under section 26 of the Constitution Act. This clause has only been used once before to appoint two extra senators to represent four regional Senate divisions: Ontario, Quebec, the Maritimes and the Western Provinces.

As vacancies open up among the normal members of the Senate, they are automatically filled by the regional senators. Regional senators may also designate themselves to a senate division in any province of their choosing in their region.

Notes:

1 Party listed was the last party of which the senator was a member.
2 Senators are appointed to represent their region. Each senator may choose to designate a geographic area within their region as his or her division.
3 Senators are appointed by the Governor-General of Canada on the recommendation of the prime minister.

See also
Lists of Canadian senators

References

External links
Current Senators List Parliament Website
A Legislative and Historical Overview of the Senate

Prince Edward Island
Senators
Senators